The 2011 Philippine Collegiate Championship was the fourth Philippine Collegiate Championship for basketball in its current incarnation, and the ninth edition overall.

The San Sebastian Stags defeated the two-time defending champion Ateneo Blue Eagles in the championship series where the Stags had a twice-to-beat advantage and denied the Blue Eagles for a chance of a three-peat in the tournament; meanwhile, the San Beda Red Lions defeated the UC Webmasters in the third-place game, 82–69.

Format
The 2011 championship will feature a new format. The format ensures that the University Athletic Association of the Philippines (UAAP) and National Collegiate Athletic Association (NCAA) champions automatically qualify to a round robin Final Four, and the respective semifinalists in both leagues and the finalists in the Cebu Schools Athletic Foundation, Inc. (CESAFI) qualify for the main draw. Other teams would have to qualify through the regional championships. In the Final Four, the team with the best record will have a twice-to-beat advantage against the #2 team.

Regional championships

North/Central Luzon
Champion teams from Vigan, Pampanga, Pangasinan and Baguio will dispute one berth that will face one of the two winners in the Metro Manila regionals.

Metro Manila
Champion teams from the Inter-Scholastic Athletic Association (ISAA), National Athletic Association of Schools, Colleges and Universities (NAASCU), Universities and Colleges Athletic Association (UCAA), Universities and Colleges of Luzon Athletic Association (UCLAAI) and the Men's National Collegiate Athletic Association (MNCAA), and non-playoff teams (5th and 6th) from the UAAP and NCAA will dispute two berths. One winner will face the North/Central Luzon champion while another will face the South Luzon/Bicol champion.

South Luzon/Bicol
Champion teams from the National Collegiate Athletic Association (Philippines) South, Quezon, Legazpi City, Sorsogon and Naga will dispute one berth that will face one of the two winners in the Metro Manila regionals.

Visayas
Champion teams from the Visayas will dispute one berth that will face the CESAFI runner-up in the main draw.

Mindanao
Champion teams from Mindanao will dispute one berth that will face the CESAFI champion in the main draw.

Qualifying

Automatic qualifiers

Regional qualifiers

Metro Manila
Games were held at the Filoil Flying V Arena, San Juan

Group A

Group B

Northern/Central Luzon
Games were held at the University of Northern Philippines campus at Vigan.

Southern Luzon/Bicol
Games were held at the Naga Coliseum at Naga.

Mindanao
Games were held at the Almendras Gym at Davao City

Visayas
Games will be held at the Ormoc City Superdome at Ormoc from November 27 to 28.

Main draw

Luzon/Metro Manila bracket
Games were held at the Filoil Flying V Arena, San Juan, except for the regional final, which will be held at the Ormoc City Superdome, Ormoc.

First round

Second Round onwards
*Overtime

Southern Islands bracket
Games were held at the Ormoc City Superdome, Ormoc.

Final four
Games are set to be held at the Filoil Flying V Arena, San Juan.

Team standings

Schedule

Results

Battle for third

Finals

UAAP-NCAA Juniors Dual Meet
This tournament is for the benefit of Kapit Bisig Para sa Pasig, a project of the ABS-CBN Foundation. The runners-up of the NCAA and UAAP will battle for the third spot while the champion of each league will battle for the top spot.

Battle for third

Championship

Awards
The awardees are:
Most Valuable Player: Ian Sangalang (San Sebastian)
Mythical Five:
Nico Salva (Ateneo)
Greg Slaughter (Ateneo)
Calvin Abueva (San Sebastian)
Ian Sangalang (San Sebastian)
June Mar Fajardo (U of Cebu)
Best Coach: Topex Robinson (San Sebastian)

Final rankings

External links
Collegiate Champions League official website

2011
2011–12 in Philippine basketball leagues